Perrotia varians is a butterfly in the family Hesperiidae. It is found in eastern Madagascar. The habitat consists of forests.

References

Butterflies described in 1916
Erionotini
Taxa named by Charles Oberthür
Butterflies of Africa